Lumpi-ProVacInd is a live attenuated vaccine for cattle, made by two institutes of Indian Council of Agricultural Research for prevention of Lumpy skin disease outbreak in India. It is planned for commercial launch in early 2023. It was launched by Prime Minister  Narendra Modi and Agriculture Minister Narendra Singh Tomar. Studies concluded that it is 100 percent effective for the prevention of the disease, which complies with all government vaccine standards. It is similar to the vaccines for tuberculosis and rubella.

References 

Animal vaccines
Live vaccines
Bovine health